St. Johns County School District (SJCSD) is the public school district for St. Johns County, Florida.

It is the sole school district in the county.

History
1866 – St. Joseph Academy was founded and is the oldest Catholic high school in Florida. 
1924 – Hastings High School is opened for farm children in the southwest corner of St. Johns county 
1959 – St. Augustine High School is the St. Johns county public high school
1981 – Nease High School was opened to alleviate overcrowding at SAHS.
2000 – Pedro Menendez High School and Bartram Trail High School are opened to alleviate overcrowding at SAHS and Nease, respectively. 
2008 – Creekside High School and Ponte Vedra High School are opened to alleviate overcrowding at Bartram Trail and Nease, respectively.
2021 – Tocoi Creek High School, in the World Golf Village area of the county, opened to students in Fall 2021.

School board
The county administrative offices are located at 40 Orange Street in St. Augustine, Florida. The superintendent of SJCSD is Mr. Tim Forson, who administrates the daily operation of public schools in the county. The position of superintendent is appointed by the St. Johns County School Board, a body of five elected officers, each board member representing a specific geographic area.  The current School Board members, in order of district number, are Beverly Slough, Anthony E. Coleman Sr., Bill Mignon, Kelly Barrera, and Patrick Canan.
Board members are elected in staggered four years terms with 2-term limits; districts 1, 3 & 5 elected during midterm election cycles (next in 2022) and districts 2 & 4 elected during presidential cycles (next in 2024).

Growth
With the tremendous population growth, the number of St. Johns County academic high schools tripled between 2000 and 2008. For the 2007-2008 school year, the district had an enrollment of 27,514 students, which according to the St. Augustine Record continued its ranking as "one of the fastest-growing school districts in the state" of Florida. That figure reflected a four percent increase (1,040 students) from the previous year.

FCAT
Florida Public K-12 Schools are graded based on data from the Florida Comprehensive Assessment Test (FCAT) provided by Florida Department of Education. St. Johns County schools received the following marks:

Schools
 High schools
 Bartram Trail High School
 Beachside High School
 Creekside High School
 Pedro Menendez High School
 Allen D. Nease High School
 Ponte Vedra High School
 St. Augustine High School
 St. Johns Technical High School
 Tocoi Creek High School

 K-8 schools (Academies)
 Freedom Crossing
 Liberty Pines
 Mill Creek
 Palm Valley
 Patriot Oaks
 Pine Island
 Valley Ridge

 Middle schools
 Alice B. Landrum
 Fruit Cove
 Gamble Rogers
 Pacetti Bay
 R. J. Murray
 Sebastian
 Switzerland Point

 Elementary schools
 Cunningham Creek
 Durbin Creek
 Hickory Creek
 John A. Crookshank
 Julington Creek
 Ketterlinus
 Ocean Palms
 Osceola
 Otis A. Mason
 Palencia
 Picolata Crossing
 R. B. Hunt
 PVPV-Rawlings
 South Woods
 It was provisionally named "School J".
 The Webster School
 Timberlin Creek
 Wards Creek
 W. D. Hartley

 Alternative schools
 Gaines Alternative School at the Evelyn B. Hamblen Center
 Transition School at the Evelyn B. Hamblen Center

 Former schools
 Hastings High School - Closed in 1985
 Hastings Elementary-Junior High School - Opened in the former Hastings High in 1985, replacing the former Hastings Elementary School. In 1992 it ended its junior high school program, with the new name being Hastings Elementary School. In 2005 it closed, replaced by South Woods Elementary.

See also
List of high schools in Florida
Florida School for the Deaf and Blind - A state operated school in St. Augustine

References

External links
St. Johns County School District website

School districts in Florida
Education in St. Johns County, Florida
1869 establishments in Florida